"Hole in My Shoe" is a song by English rock band Traffic featuring a spoken-word midsection by Chris Blackwell's stepdaughter, Francine Heimann, in which she tells a little story about a giant albatross. It was released as a single in 1967 and reached number 2 in the UK Singles Chart, number 22 in the German charts, and number 4 in Canada. Composed by guitarist Dave Mason, it was disliked by the other three members of the group who felt that it did not represent the band's musical or lyrical style.

Personnel

Musicians
 Jim Capaldi – drums, backing vocals
 Dave Mason – lead vocals, guitar, Mellotron, sitar
 Steve Winwood – Hammond organ, bass guitar, piano, backing vocals
 Chris Wood – flute, backing vocals
 Francine Heimann – spoken word (uncredited)

Technical
 Eddie Kramer – engineer
 Jimmy Miller – producer

Cover version
In July 1984, Nigel Planer, who played Neil in the BBC sitcom The Young Ones , recorded a cover version of the song, which reached the same number 2 peak as the original.  It also peaked at number 29 in Australia. His version featured Barbara Gaskin on backing vocals and was produced by Dave Stewart.

References

Traffic (band) songs
1967 singles
1984 singles
Irish Singles Chart number-one singles
Songs written by Dave Mason
Song recordings produced by Jimmy Miller
1967 songs
Island Records singles
United Artists Records singles
Musical parodies
Psychedelic songs